Madudanchavadi railway station is located between  and Mavelipalayam.

References

Salem railway division
Railway stations in Salem district